The Eastvale Bridge is a bridge that carries PA Route 588 over the Beaver River between the borough of Eastvale, and the city of Beaver Falls, Pennsylvania.  The bridge opened in Beaver County on November 22, 1963, the day President John F. Kennedy was assassinated.  The bridge was named in his honor.  Today, it is commonly known as the Eastvale Bridge, or the "Blue" Bridge by Geneva College students, who have a sweeping view of the bridge in the neighborhood of College Hill.

See also 
List of crossings of the Beaver River

Bridges completed in 1963
Bridges in Beaver County, Pennsylvania
Road bridges in Pennsylvania
Bridges over the Beaver River (Pennsylvania)
Metal bridges in the United States
Truss bridges in the United States